Niagara SkyWheel is a  tall Ferris wheel in the middle of Clifton Hill, Niagara Falls, Ontario, Canada. 

Niagara SkyWheel is a Ronald Bussink Professional Rides designed R60 Giant Wheel, manufactured by Chance Rides and supplied by Chance Morgan. It opened on 17 June 2006, at a cost of $10 million.

Its 42 Swiss-manufactured fully enclosed passenger cars can each carry nine people and are heated in the winter and air conditioned in the warmer months.

The ride is approximately 12 to 15 minutes long, giving passengers views of the Niagara River, and the Horseshoe Falls and American Falls, and is open all year, from 9:00 am to 1:00 am.

References

External links
 

Ferris wheels in Canada
Buildings and structures in Niagara Falls, Ontario
Tourist attractions in Niagara Falls, Ontario